Pantaleón Salvó Saura, also known as Salvó II, was a Spanish footballer who played as a midfielder and forward for FC Espanya and RCD Espanyol. His brother Cristóbal had a great career with FC Espanya. The dates of his birth and death are unknown.

Club career
Born in Catalonia, he began his career at his hometown club FC Espanya in the early-1910s, playing with them for nearly a decade. Together with his brother, he helped the club win three Catalan championships (1912–13, 1913–14 and 1916–17) and reach the 1914 Copa del Rey Final, which still is the club's only Copa del Rey final appearance, but they lost 1–2 to Athletic Club, courtesy of a brace from Severino Zuazo.

He also helped Espanya win the 1914 Pyrenees Cup, netting two goals in the final to help his side to a 3–1 victory over Cométe et Simot. In 1918 he followed his brother Cristóbal to RCD Espanyol, where he presumably retired.

Honours

Club
FC Espanya
Catalan championship:
Champions (3): 1912–13, 1913–14 and 1916–17

Copa del Rey:
Runner-up (1): 1914

Pyrenees Cup:
Champions (1): 1914

References

Year of birth missing
Year of death missing
Spanish footballers
Association football forwards
Footballers from Catalonia
RCD Espanyol footballers